is a Japanese football player. He plays as a centre back.

Honours

Club
Tampines Rovers
 Singapore League Cup: 2011

Yangon United
 MFF Charity Cup: 2016

Career statistics 
As of 23 June 2019

References

External links

1986 births
People from Kashiwa
Badak Lampung F.C. players
Ryutsu Keizai University alumni
Association football people from Chiba Prefecture
Japanese footballers
J2 League players
Singapore Premier League players
Roasso Kumamoto players
Albirex Niigata Singapore FC players
Tampines Rovers FC players
Japanese expatriate footballers
Expatriate footballers in Singapore
Association football defenders
Borneo F.C. players
Living people